Deering Harvester Company was founded in 1874 by William Deering. In 1902, Deering Harvester Company and McCormick Harvesting Machine Company, along with three smaller agricultural equipment firms (Milwaukee, Plano, and Warder, Bushnell & Glessner — manufacturers of Champion brand) merged to create the International Harvester Company which is still in operation today as the Case IH operations of CNH Global.

Later William's sons, Charles Deering and James Deering, took ownership of the company.

References

See also 
Charles Deering Estate
Villa Vizcaya

Agricultural machinery manufacturers of the United States
1902 mergers and acquisitions